The 2003 Ukrainian Cup Final was a football match that took place at the NSC Olimpiyskiy on 25 May 2003. The match was the 12th Ukrainian Cup Final and it was contested by Dynamo Kyiv and Shakhtar Donetsk. The 2003 Ukrainian Cup Final was the 12th to be held in the Ukrainian capital of Kyiv. Dynamo won the match 2–1.

Match details

References

External links 
 Calendar of Matches - Schedule of the 2001-02 Ukrainian Cup on the Ukrainian Soccer History web-site (ukrsoccerhistory.com). 

Cup Final
Ukrainian Cup finals
Ukrainian Cup Final 2003
Ukrainian Cup Final 2003
Ukrainian Cup Final 2003